Suresh K Sitaraman is the Regents' Professor and Morris M. Bryan, Jr. Professor of the George W. Woodruff School of Mechanical Engineering, Georgia Institute of Technology, Atlanta, USA.

Education 
Dr Suresh Sitaraman received his Bachelor of Engineering (B.E.) degree in Mechanical Engineering from Regional Engineering College, Tiruchirappalli (now known as National Institute of Technology, Tiruchirappalli) affiliated to University of Madras in 1982. He also obtained his Master of Applied Science (M.A.Sc.) degree from the University of Ottawa, Canada in 1985 and Doctor of Philosophy (PhD) from the Ohio State University, USA in 1989.

Career 
Dr. Sitaraman began at Georgia Institute of Technology in 1995 as an Assistant Professor. Prior, he was at IBM Corporation.

Awards 
He received many awards:

 Distinguished Alumnus Award from National Institute of Technology, Tiruchirappalli
Thomas French Achievement Award, Department of Mechanical and Aerospace Engineering, The Ohio State University, 2012
American Society of Mechanical Engineers
 Applied Mechanics Award, Electronic and Photonic Packaging Division, 2012
 Fellow, 2004
 International Congress Symposium Chair, 1997
 Georgia Institute of Technology
 Sigma Xi (Georgia Tech Chapter) Sustained Research Award, 2008
 Outstanding Faculty Leadership Award for the Development of Graduate Research Assistants, 2006
 Packaging Research Center Outstanding Faculty Educator Award, 1998
 Packaging Research Center Technology Program Award, 1998
 Institute of Microelectronics and Packaging Society
 International Symposium on Advanced Packaging Materials Best Paper of the Session, 2000 and 1999
 Institute of Electrical and Electronics Engineers (IEEE)
Transactions of Advanced Packaging Commendable Paper Award, 2004
 Transactions on Components and Packaging Technologies  Best Paper of the Year, 2001 and 2000
 Transactions on Compoents, Packaging, and Manufacturing Technology,  Associate Editor
 Metro Atlanta Engineer of the Year in Education, 1999
 National Science Foundation Faculty Early Career Development Award, 1997-2002
 National Institute of Standards and Technology Advanced Technology Program Award, 1998

References 

National Institute of Technology, Tiruchirappalli alumni
Ohio State University alumni
University of Ottawa alumni
Georgia Tech faculty
Indian American
Fellows of the American Society of Mechanical Engineers
Year of birth missing (living people)
Living people